Bilal Akbar Bhatti is a Pakistani politician who was a Member of the Provincial Assembly of the Punjab, from May 2013 to May 2018.

Early life and education
He was born on 24 October 1976 in Lahore.

He graduated in 1996 from Government College University and has a degree of Bachelor of Arts.

Political career

He was elected to the Provincial Assembly of the Punjab as a candidate of Pakistan Muslim League (Nawaz) from Constituency PP-235 (Vehari-IV) in 2013 Pakistani general election.

References

Living people
Punjab MPAs 2013–2018
1976 births
Government College University, Lahore alumni
Politicians from Lahore
Pakistan Muslim League (N) politicians